Twinklers Vidyaniketan is a school located at No. CA1, 5th Main, N.G.E.F. Layout Nagarabhavi 1st Stage, Bengaluru - 560072. This belongs to the Jagadeshwari Educational Society.

Schools in Bangalore